Southeast station  (formerly known as Brewster North station) is a commuter rail stop on the Metro-North Railroad's Harlem Line, located in Southeast, New York. It is the terminus of the Harlem Line electrified service, and with the exception of rush hour service and a roundtrip on weekends, passengers heading to stations further north to Wassaic have to transfer here to diesel powered service.

History
The current terminal complex opened in 1980 as a delayed replacement for the Dykeman's station, closed over a decade earlier, and took its current name in October 2003.

Station layout
The station has one eight-car-long high-level island platform serving trains in both directions. North of the station, the two tracks merge and electrification ends. Just south of the station is Metro-North's Southeast Diesel Maintenance Facility.

The extensive parking at the station is fed by a wide,  access road known as Independent Way that connects to NY 312 right next to its interchange with Interstate 84, making it very convenient to reach. There is no disabled-accessible parking available at the station, other than for town residents with permits or for a maximum 16-hour metered period. The station traffic has led to the construction of a shopping plaza and Home Depot along the road at the crest of the rise between the exit and the station; it can easily be seen when approaching the exit along I-84 eastbound.

References

External links

Article related to Southeast Station (IRidetheHarlemLine)

Metro-North Railroad stations in New York (state)
Railway stations in Putnam County, New York
Railway stations in the United States opened in 1980
1980 establishments in New York (state)
Transportation in Dutchess County, New York